Picroxena is a genus of moths belonging to the family Tortricidae.

Species
Picroxena scorpiura Meyrick, 1921

References

External links
tortricidae.com

Chlidanotini
Taxa named by Edward Meyrick
Tortricidae genera